Pulp are an English rock band formed in Sheffield in 1978. Their best-known line-up from their heyday (1992–1997) consisted of Jarvis Cocker (vocals, guitar, keyboards), Russell Senior (guitar, violin), Candida Doyle (keyboards), Nick Banks (drums, percussion), Steve Mackey (bass) and Mark Webber (guitar, keyboards).

Throughout the 1980s the band struggled to find success, but gained prominence in the UK in the mid-1990s with the release of the albums His 'n' Hers in 1994 and particularly Different Class in 1995, which reached the number one spot in the UK Albums Chart. The album spawned four top ten singles, including "Common People" and "Sorted for E's & Wizz", both of which reached number two in the UK Singles Chart. Pulp's musical style during this period consisted of disco-influenced pop-rock coupled with references to British culture in their lyrics in the form of a "kitchen sink drama"-style. Cocker and the band became reluctant figureheads of the Britpop movement, and were nominated for the Mercury Music Prize in 1994 for His 'n' Hers; they won the prize in 1996 for Different Class and were nominated again in 1998 for This Is Hardcore. Pulp headlined the Pyramid Stage of the Glastonbury Festival twice and were regarded among the Britpop "big four", along with Oasis, Blur and Suede.

The band released We Love Life in 2001 and then took a decade-long break, having sold more than 10 million records. Pulp reunited and played live again in 2011, with dates at the Isle of Wight Festival, Reading and Leeds Festivals, Pohoda, Sziget Festival, Primavera Sound, the Exit festival, and the Wireless Festival. A number of additional concert dates were afterward added to their schedule. In January 2013, Pulp released "After You", a song originally demoed for We Love Life, as a digital download single. It was the band's first single release since "Bad Cover Version" in 2002. On 9 March 2014, Pulp and filmmaker Florian Habicht premiered the feature documentary Pulp: A Film about Life, Death & Supermarkets at SXSW Music and Film Festival in Austin, Texas. The film toured the international film festival circuit and was released theatrically by  Oscilloscope Laboratories in the US in November 2014. It is the first film about Pulp (and Sheffield) that has been made in collaboration with the band. The band once again went on hiatus following this, but in 2022, Cocker announced that the band would be reuniting for a second time to play a series of shows in 2023.

History

Early years: 1978–1983
Pulp were formed in 1978 at The City School in Sheffield by Jarvis Cocker, then 15 years old, and Peter Dalton, then 14. Cocker's original preference was to name the band after the film Pulp starring Michael Caine, though it was decided that this was too short. Instead, the two took inspiration from a copy of the Financial Times which listed the Arabicas coffee bean in its commodity index. Cocker and Dalton used this, with a slight spelling change, and the band became "Arabicus". Early rehearsals took place in Cocker's house and featured Cocker, Dalton and Dalton's younger brother Ian. After finally deciding on "Arabicus Pulp", a fixed line-up was then established: Cocker, Dalton and two friends of theirs, David "Fungus" Lockwood and Mark Swift. The band played their first public gig at Rotherham Arts Centre in July 1980. Later that year, Cocker met future member Russell Senior, who recognised Cocker from his charismatic sales techniques in his part-time job at the local fish market.

Their musical style at this time was varied, approximately described as "a cross between ABBA and The Fall". A local fanzine also noted this eclecticism, describing them as sounding "as if they listen to the John Peel show every night in an endless quest for influences". Indeed, in October 1981, they gave a demo tape to Peel, who granted them a Peel Session. The session was a giant leap forward for the young band, who became well known on the local music scene as a result. The tracks recorded were in the typical Sheffield sound of the time (cf. The Human League and Comsat Angels): electronic new wave and post-punk. These tracks were released in 2006 on The Peel Sessions compilation.

Despite their exposure on national radio, success was not forthcoming and, apart from Cocker, most of the core line-up left for university. Soon, a new set of musicians were gathered: Simon Hinkler (who later joined The Mission), David Hinkler, Wayne Furniss, Peter Boam, Gary Wilson, and Cocker's sister, Saskia. They managed to get enough local backing to record a mini-album in late 1982, entitled It (the title was a pun on pulp-it, as if the band were preaching to the audience), which was released in April 1983 by Red Rhino Records. This largely consisted of folkish, romantic pop songs influenced by Leonard Cohen and was a change of direction from the Peel Sessions two years earlier. The album was later released by Cherry Red Records.

Though It failed commercially and fame was still elusive, the band continued to seek commercial success even to the point of recording a single, "Everybody's Problem"/"There Was". The single demonstrated a style shift advised by Red Rhino's Tony Perrin who had convinced Cocker that he "could write commercial songs like Wham!". This approach also failed and Cocker was becoming unhappy with his chosen musical direction. He was set to break up the band and go to university himself before a practice with Russell Senior (violin, guitar, vocals) and Magnus Doyle (drums) led to the establishment of a new, more experimental, artier and noisier direction for Pulp. They were subsequently augmented by Peter Mansell (bass) and Tim Allcard (keyboards, saxophone, poetry).

Independent days: 1984–1991
The new incarnation of Pulp survived a number of ill-fated gigs (including one at a rugby club at Brunel University which ended in a riot) before Allcard left to be replaced on keyboards by Magnus Doyle's sister Candida. Following her first performance with the band, they were signed to Fire Records. Soon after signing to Fire, in November 1985, Cocker fell out of a window while trying to impress a girl with a Spider-Man impression and ended up in hospital, temporarily requiring the use of a wheelchair in which he appeared during concerts. Pulp's relationship with Fire Records was tempestuous and Cocker admitted later that the band only accepted the deal as it "was the only offer on the table". During this period, the singles "Little Girl" and "Dogs Are Everywhere" were released.

Pulp's next major release was Freaks (1987), an album recorded in one week due to record label pressure. Cocker was irritated, and remarked that "the songs could've been done a lot better if we'd have had a bit more time...". The release of Freaks ended up being delayed for a year, and the record was not well received. The album's darker style may be considered the antithesis of the happy and optimistic It.  When Freaks failed to be a success, Pulp recorded tracks with Chakk's label FON in Sheffield. A single called "Death Comes To Town" was due to be released by FON in early 1988, but this relationship disintegrated and the release was cancelled. It was during this time that Cocker was taking a part-time foundation course at Sheffield Polytechnic. This led to him leaving for London to study film at Central Saint Martins College of Art and Design, effectively folding the band.

The fold was short-lived however. Steve Mackey, a regular at their Sheffield and London gigs, was also studying in London and was asked to join the band as a bass player. The line-up now consisted of Cocker, Mackey, Senior, Candida Doyle, Nick Banks (drums). In mid-1989, they began recording another album for Fire, this time with a bigger budget and production from Alan Smyth, called Separations. This was a progression of the style of Freaks, with Leonard Cohen-esque ballads on side one and an acid house infused track-listing on side two. The disparate styles can be attributed to Cocker and Mackey's different and changing tastes; Mackey introduced Cocker to house music which led to them both going to raves, while Cocker introduced Mackey to "Scott Walker and Serge Gainsbourg". Like Freaks, the release of Separations was delayed, to an extent lessening the potential impact. In the meantime, however, in 1991, a 12" recording, "My Legendary Girlfriend", became music periodical NMEs single of the week. Stuart Maconie described it in his review as "a throbbing ferment of nightclub soul and teen opera". Furthermore, "Countdown" began to be mentioned in the mainstream press, heralding a turning point in Pulp's quest for fame.

Commercial height: 1992–1996

Pulp's repertoire was growing rapidly. Tracks such as "Babies", "Space" and "She's a Lady" were being played live throughout 1991 and in October of that year, they played their first overseas gig, a concert organised by French magazine Les Inrockuptibles. However, the band were still frustrated that Separations still had not seen a release and so Pulp left Fire and signed to Warp Records imprint Gift Records in 1992. Buoyed by a changing musical current, in June 1992 Pulp released "O.U." on Gift while Fire finally released Separations in the same month. Melody Maker made "O.U" a single of the week alongside "The Drowners" by Suede, a prominent new band. Pulp then signed to Island Records, who jointly released (with Gift) the singles "Babies" and "Razzmatazz" to increasing chart success. Next were the singles "Lipgloss" and their first top 40 hit on the UK Singles Chart, "Do You Remember the First Time?", which were put out as full Island releases. These singles were followed by the Ed Buller-produced album, His 'n' Hers (1994), which reached number nine on the UK Albums Chart and was nominated for the Mercury Music Prize.

This sudden increase in popularity was helped by the massive media interest in Britpop alongside acts such as Suede, Oasis and Blur, with Pulp supporting the latter in a 1994 tour of the United States. 1995 saw the peak of Pulp's fame, with the release of their number two single on the UK Singles Chart, "Common People", in May 1995 and their performance in June at the Glastonbury Festival (standing in for The Stone Roses at the last minute). A double A-side single, "Sorted for E's & Wizz/Mis-Shapes", was to precede the release of their next album, Different Class (1995). Upon the release of "Sorted for E's and Wizz", the Daily Mirror printed a front-page story headed "BAN THIS SICK STUNT" alongside a story by Kate Thornton which said the song was "pro-drugs" and called for the single to be banned. The single had an inlay which showed how to conceal amphetamines in a DIY 'wrap'. Cocker released a statement two days later saying: "...'Sorted' is not a pro-drugs song. Nowhere on the sleeve does it say you are supposed to put drugs in here but I understand the confusion. I don't think anyone who listens to 'Sorted' would come away thinking it had a pro-drugs message." The single reached number two on the UK Singles Charts.

Released in October 1995, Different Class garnered significant critical praise and debuted at the top of the UK Album Chart. This was the first album featuring Pulp fan-club president Mark Webber, who became a permanent member of the band on guitar and keyboards. The album followed similar themes to their previous work with observations of life expressed through Cocker's sexualised, sometimes dark and witty lyrics. Other singles released from Different Class were "Disco 2000" and "Something Changed", which reached numbers seven and ten respectively in the UK. In September 1996, Different Class won the Mercury Music Prize.

It was at this time that Cocker gained significant media exposure due to a notorious prank at the 1996 BRIT Awards, where he invaded the stage in protest during pop singer Michael Jackson's performance of "Earth Song" and "wiggled his backside" at the audience.  After complaints by Jackson and his entourage, Cocker spent the night in Kensington Police Station charged with actual bodily harm and assaulting the child performers. However, with British comedian and former solicitor Bob Mortimer acting as legal representation, he was released without charge. This incident propelled Cocker into great controversy in the UK and elsewhere, and Pulp's record sales soared as a result. The event also coincided with the beginning of their first arena tour and the Daily Mirror, who had attacked the band months earlier, set up a "Justice for Jarvis" campaign backing his actions and carried out a stunt at Pulp's Sheffield Arena gig on 29 February, handing out free T-shirts. The NME described Cocker's actions as a "great publicity stunt" which was "creative, subversive and very, very funny", while Melody Maker described Cocker as, "arguably the Fifth Most Famous Man in Britain" and suggested he should be knighted.

In March 1996, a compilation of Pulp's early recordings on Fire Records entitled Countdown 1992–1983 was released on the Nectar Masters label. It received largely negative reviews, but due to the band's popularity at the time it reached the top 10 of the UK charts. Cocker, whose permission was not sought before release, urged fans not to purchase the album, comparing it to "a garish old family photograph album". Later in 1996, Pulp gained minor international recognition on the back of the inclusion of the track "Mile End" on the Trainspotting soundtrack. In August, the band played their last public performance for almost two years as headliners of the 1996 V Festival.

Until break-up: 1997–2002

It was during this period of intense fame and tabloid scrutiny that longtime member and major innovator in the band's sound Russell Senior decided to leave the band, saying, "it wasn't creatively rewarding to be in Pulp anymore". The band were due to begin working on a new album in late 1996. However, Cocker was having difficulty with the celebrity lifestyle, battling cocaine addiction and a break-up of a long-term relationship. When the band came to begin work on the next album, they had only one song – "Help the Aged". This creative inertia meant the band took over a year to finish the next record. Indeed, it was Cocker's disillusionment with his long-desired wish for fame that made up much of the subject matter of This Is Hardcore, which was released in March 1998. The album took a darker and more challenging tone than that of Different Class and lyrical topics – pornography (the title track), fame ("Glory Days") and the after effects of drugs ("The Fear") – were dealt with more earnestly than on previous records. Also in 1998, Pulp collaborated with Patrick Doyle on the song "Like A Friend" for the soundtrack to the film Great Expectations. The song was also used in the Adult Swim cartoon The Venture Bros. season 4 finale "Operation: P.R.O.M."

Pulp then spent a few years "in the wilderness" before reappearing in 2001 with a new album, We Love Life. The extended period between the release of This is Hardcore and We Love Life is partly attributed to having initially recorded the songs which comprise the album and being dissatisfied with the results. Subsequent interviews also suggested interpersonal and artistic differences, including managing the fallout of the Britpop/Different Class era. Singer/songwriter Scott Walker agreed to produce the record and this symbolised a new phase in Pulp's development. This new effort fell short of expectations and was to be Pulp's last.

Pulp subsequently undertook a tour of the National Parks in the UK, even playing a show as far north as Elgin in Scotland. Richard Hawley, the Sheffield-based singer/songwriter, was also present on various dates on this tour. He later described it as "very much pink feather boas and glamour which was great and brilliant. That was about trying to find glamour among all the shit and I loved all that". In 2002 the band announced that they were leaving their label, Island. A greatest hits package was released: Hits, with one new track. It is unclear whether this was the band's decision or released to satisfy contractual agreements. A music festival, Auto, was organised (held at Rotherham's Magna centre) where they played their last gig before embarking on a 9-year hiatus.

After break-up: 2003–2010
Cocker was involved in a number of one-offs and side projects, including the group Relaxed Muscle with Jason Buckle and the film Harry Potter and the Goblet of Fire, where he fronted a group which included Steve Mackey and members of Radiohead. In 2006 he collaborated with Air, Neil Hannon and Charlotte Gainsbourg on her album entitled 5:55. In 2007 he appeared on Air's album Pocket Symphony, co-writing and giving vocals to the tracks "One Hell of a Party" and "The Duelist". His first solo album, Jarvis, with the participation of Mackey, was released to critical acclaim in November 2006. Candida Doyle has performed live with Cocker on his solo tours. Mackey produced tracks on the debut album by M.I.A., Arular, and on Someone To Drive You Home by the Long Blondes, both of which were critically well received. He has also produced tracks for Bromheads Jacket and Florence + The Machine.

On 11 September 2006 the band re-released three of their albums (His 'n' Hers, Different Class, and This Is Hardcore), each with a bonus disc of B-sides, demos and rarities. On 23 October 2006 a 2-CD set compiling all of Pulp's John Peel Sessions from 1982 to 2001 was released.

First reunion: 2011–2013
In November 2010 it was announced that the Different Class line-up (Cocker, Banks, Doyle, Mackey, Senior and Webber) would be playing at the Wireless festival in London's Hyde Park and a Saturday slot at the Isle of Wight Festival in 2011.
In a message sent to the band's official mailing list on 1 January 2011, Cocker said the large amount of interest in the band's reunion had been "an inspiration," and that he was pleased with how rehearsals were going.

The band announced 22 concerts between May and September 2011, taking place in Europe and Australia. Pulp were one of the surprise special guests at Glastonbury Festival 2011 in June where they played on The Park stage on Saturday evening. They performed at the Sziget Festival in Hungary on 10 August, Way Out West Festival in Sweden on 13 August, and played as co-headliners to The Strokes at the Reading Festival and the Leeds Festival during the final weekend of August 2011. They headlined the Electric Picnic on 4 September, their last festival of the year. On 9 January 2012, the Coachella festival line-up was released, with Pulp listed as part of the line-up. Further dates were announced, including North and South America and a concert at the Royal Albert Hall in support of the Teenage Cancer Trust. Senior did not take part in the 2012 gigs. 

In February 2012, It, Freaks and Separations (the albums released by Fire Records) were re-issued. These editions came with bonus tracks, including "Death Goes to the Disco", "Dogs Are Everywhere" and "Sink or Swim".

Cocker told ShortList magazine in April 2012 that he was working on ideas for new Pulp songs, but in November he told Q that the band had no plans to release new material and would be "cruising off into the sunset" at the end of the year, signalling a possible end to the reunion.

The band played a one-off concert in their hometown of Sheffield in December that year, at the 13,500 capacity Motorpoint Arena and made a previously unreleased track, "After You", available for download to those who had attended the concert. It was subsequently released to the general public in January 2013 via digital download. The song had previously only existed in demo form. Their last performance was to promote the song on The Jonathan Ross Show on 9 February 2013. The remixed version of "After You" by Soulwax later went on to be used in the 2013 video game Grand Theft Auto V as a track on the ingame radio station, Soulwax FM.

In May 2015, a music heritage plaque was unveiled at the venue of the band's first gig, The Leadmill, Sheffield. Band members Jarvis Cocker, Nick Banks, Steve Mackey, Candida Doyle and Mark Webber were present at the ceremony.

Second reunion: 2023
In July 2022, following speculation from a cryptic Instagram post, Cocker announced that the band would reunite for a series of concerts in 2023. Nick Banks also tweeted confirming the announcement by saying "Hey folks, unsurprisingly it’s has all gone a bit mental on here. Gig details will be revealed as and when. Stay calm, hug your #pulp records and dream of going mental sometime in 2023." Cocker has also appeared at a concert with Richard Hawley (former touring guitarist of first reunion), speculating his involvement in the reunion.

The reunion was confirmed on 28 October 2022, with dates announced at Finsbury Park, TRNSMT, Latitude Festival as well as two homecoming shows at Sheffield Arena. Former Pulp bassist, Steve Mackey announced on his Instagram that he would not be taking part but stated "Wishing Candy, Nick, Mark and Jarvis the very best with forthcoming performances in the UK and also an enormous thanks to Pulp’s amazing fanbase, many of whom have sent me lovely messages today".

On 2 March 2023, the band announced that bassist Steve Mackey had died at the age of 56.

Band members

Current members
 Jarvis Cocker – lead vocals, guitar, keyboards (1978–2002, 2011–2013, 2022–present)
 Candida Doyle – keyboards, organ, backing vocals (1984–1986, 1987–2002, 2011–2013, 2022–present)
 Nick Banks – drums, percussion (1986–2002, 2011–2013, 2022–present)
 Mark Webber – guitar, keyboards (1995–2002, 2011–2013, 2022–present; touring musician 1994–1995)

Former touring musicians
 Saskia Cocker – backing vocals (1982–1983, 2012)
 Jill Taylor  – backing vocals (1982–1983, 2012)
 Garry Wilson – drums (1982–1983)
 Richard Hawley – guitar (1998–2002, 2011–2012)
 Leo Abrahams – guitar (2011–2013)
 Jean Cook  – violin (2012)

Former members
 Peter Dalton – guitar, keyboards, vocals (1978–1982)
 Ian Dalton – percussion (1978–1979)
 David "Fungus" Lockwood – bass (1979)
 Mark Swift – drums, percussion (1979–1980)
 Philip Thompson – bass (1979–1980)
 Jimmy Sellars – drums (1980–1981)
 Jamie Pinchbeck – bass (1980–1982)
 Wayne Furniss – drums, guitar, bass (1981–1982)
 David Hinkler – keyboards, organ, trombone, guitar (1982–1983)
 Simon Hinkler – bass, guitar, keyboards, piano (1982–1983)
 Peter Boam – bass, guitar, drums, keyboards (1982–1983)
 Russell Senior – guitar, violin, vocals (1983–1997, 2011)
 Magnus Doyle – drums, keyboards (1983–1986)
 Peter Mansell – bass (1983–1986)
 Tim Allcard – keyboards, saxophone, poetry, drums (1983–1984)
 Michael Paramore – drums, percussion (1983)
 Steven Havenhand – bass (1986–1988)
 Captain Sleep – keyboards (1986–1987)
 Antony Genn – bass (1988)
 Steve Mackey – bass (1988–2002, 2011–2013; died 2023)

Timeline

Discography

 It (1983)
 Freaks (1987)
 Separations (recorded in 1989; released in 1992)
 His 'n' Hers (1994)
 Different Class (1995)
 This Is Hardcore (1998)
 We Love Life (2001)

Awards and nominations
{| class="wikitable sortable plainrowheaders" 
|-
! scope="col" | Award
! scope="col" | Year
! scope="col" | Category
! scope="col" | Nominee(s)
! scope="col" | Result
! scope="col" class="unsortable"| 
|-
! scope="row" rowspan=4|Brit Awards
| rowspan=4|1996
| British Group
| Themselves
| 
| rowspan=4|
|-
| British Album of the Year
| Different Class
| 
|-
| British Single of the Year
| rowspan=2|"Common People"
| 
|-
| British Video of the Year
| 
|-
! scope="row"| D&AD Awards
| 1996
| Pop Promo Videos: Direction
| "Disco 2000"
| 
|
|-
! scope="row" rowspan=3|Ivor Novello Awards
| 1996
| rowspan=2|Best Song Musically and Lyrically
| "Common People"
| 
|
|-
| 1999
| "A Little Soul"
| 
|
|-
| 2017
| Outstanding Song Collection
| Themselves
| 
|
|-
! scope="row" rowspan=3|MTV Europe Music Awards
| rowspan=3|1996
| Best Song
| "Disco 2000"
| 
|rowspan=3|
|-
| Best Group
| rowspan=2|Themselves
| 
|-
| Best New Act
| 
|-
! scope="row"|MVPA Awards
| 1998
| Best International Video
| "Help the Aged"
| 
|
|-
! scope="row" rowspan=3|Mercury Prize
| 1994
| rowspan=3|Album of the Year
| His 'n' Hers
| 
| rowspan=3|
|-
| 1996
| Different Class
| 
|-
| 1998
| This Is Hardcore
| 
|-
! scope="row" rowspan=14|NME Awards
| rowspan=6|1996
| Best Band
| rowspan=2|Themselves
| 
|rowspan=7|
|-
| Best Live Act
| 
|-
| Best Video
| rowspan=2|"Common People"
| 
|-
| rowspan=2|Best Single
| 
|-
| "Sorted for E's & Wizz"
| 
|-
| Best Album
| Different Class
| 
|-
| 1997
| rowspan=2|Best Band
| rowspan=2|Themselves
|
|-
| rowspan=3|1999
| 
|rowspan=3|
|-
| Best Album
| This Is Hardcore
| 
|-
| Best Single
| "This is Hardcore"
| 
|-
| rowspan=3|2012
| Outstanding Contribution to Music
| rowspan=3|Themselves
| 
|
|-
| Best Live Band
| 
|rowspan=2|
|-
| Greatest Music Moment of the Year
| 
|-
| 2015
| Best Music Film
| A Film About Life, Death And Supermarkets
| 
|
|-
! scope="row" rowspan=4|Q Awards
| 1996
| rowspan=2|Best Live Act
| rowspan=2|Themselves
| 
| rowspan=3|
|-
| rowspan=2|1998
| 
|-
| Best Album
| This Is Hardcore
| 
|-
| 2012
| Inspiration Award
| rowspan=2|Themselves
| 
|
|-
! scope="row"|Smash Hits Poll Winners Party
| 1996
| Best Indie-Type Band
| 
|

Notes

References
 Mark Sturdy, Truth & Beauty: The Story of Pulp (Omnibus Press, 2003) – comprehensive biography
 Jean-Marie Pottier, Brit Pulp. La britpop selon Pulp, de Thatcher à Blair (Autour du Livre, 2009) – a French essay about the connections between Pulp and English popular culture of its time

External links

 Discography at acrylicafternoons.com
 PulpWiki – a comprehensive user-generated resource for everything related to Pulp
 Bar Italia – active discussion forum for Pulp fans worldwide
 The Beat Is The Law – Fanfare For The Common People (2011) – critically acclaimed music documentary about Pulp's rise to fame
 Pulp: a Film about Life, Death & Supermarkets – Florian Habicht's film that launched at SXSW in March 2014
 
 

Britpop groups
British alternative rock groups
British indie pop groups
Musical groups from Sheffield
Musical groups established in 1978
Musical groups disestablished in 2002
Musical groups reestablished in 2010
English art rock groups
NME Awards winners